Julia Reynolds is a reporter with the Center for Investigative Reporting. She also edits El Andar,  a magazine of Latino politics and culture.

Career
She works as a criminal justice reporter at The Monterey County Herald. Reynolds has reported for Medianews newspapers, PBS, NPR, 60 Minutes, The Nation, and many other media outlets. Her work focuses on gangs, crime and prisons. Prior, she worked as an editor for El Andar. She was a 2009 Nieman Fellow at Harvard University and a 2011 Steinbeck Fellow at San Jose State University.

Books
“Nuestra Familia“ to be published in the fall of 2014 by Chicago Review Press

Awards and honors
Reynolds has won a number awards from the following:
National Association of Hispanic Journalists
The California Public Defenders’ Association
New California Media
California Newspaper Publishers Association
The National Council on Crime and Delinquency
World Affairs Council
Investigative Reporters and Editors’ Tom Renner Medal

References

El Andar website

American women journalists
Living people
Year of birth missing (living people)
21st-century American journalists
The Nation (U.S. magazine) people
21st-century American women